Cayey, officially Cayey de Muesas, is a mountain town and municipality in central Puerto Rico located on the Sierra de Cayey within the Central Mountain range, north of Salinas and Guayama; south of Cidra and Caguas; east of Aibonito and Salinas; and west of San Lorenzo. Cayey is spread over 21 barrios plus Cayey Pueblo (the downtown area and the administrative center). It is part of the San Juan-Caguas-Guaynabo Metropolitan Statistical Area.

Cayey is notable for its surrounding mountains. The city has been actively growing since the 1990s, evidenced by its designation as a Metropolitan Area by the U.S. Census Bureau. It has experienced significant growth in commerce, and many major retailers, such as Wal-Mart have opened stores in the city. Industries in Cayey include sugar, tobacco and poultry. For tobacco there is a well-known company called Consolidated Cigar Corp. A new coliseum and hospital facilities have also been built. Coca-Cola is a major corporation that has a manufacturing facility in the town. Cayey is also host to one of the campuses of the University of Puerto Rico, the University of Puerto Rico at Cayey.

History
Cayey was founded on August 17, 1773, by Juan Mata Vázquez, who became its first mayor. It is popularly said that Cayey derives its name from the Taino Indian word for "a place of waters". It was named Cayey de Muesas in honor of Miguel de Muesas, the then governor of Puerto Rico. The town is located in a valley nestled between Puerto Rico's Cordillera Central mountain range and the Sierra de Cayey at roughly the midpoint of routes PR-1 and PR-52. The routes lead to a popular drive that provides panoramic views of the island from its highest points.

Puerto Rico was ceded by Spain in the aftermath of the Spanish–American War under the terms of the Treaty of Paris of 1898 and became a territory of the United States. In 1899, the United States Department of War conducted a census of Puerto Rico finding that the population of Cayey was 14,442.

An education base began in the early to mid-1950s when the Interamerican University opened a branch in Cayey providing teacher training through a night class scheme. In 1967 the University of Puerto Rico opened a campus in the former Henry Barracks Military Reservation, and in the early 1980s El Turabo University, subsidiary of the Ana G. Mendez conglomerate opened a campus in the old tobacco factory at the entrance of town. The Interamerican University will be opening a Graduate campus in front of the main town square (downtown), and there are conversations with a foreign educational concern to open a technology campus using the buildings left over by the Gordonshire Knitting Mills. There are three major private schools: Radians School, the long established Colegio de Nuestra Senora de la Merced and La Milagrosa School. Cayey's health care base expanded in the mid-1960s with the Mennonite Medical Center and a Municipal
Hospital along with laboratories, and urgent care centers that cater to the poor and the elderly.

With the construction of the Interstate (PR-52), Cayey has evolved into a "bedroom community" with gated housing developments, located just 30 minutes away from San Juan and 45 minutes away from Ponce. With pleasant weather and good private schools, Cayey has become a premium location for the affluent.

Hurricane Maria on September 20, 2017, triggered numerous landslides in Cayey with significant amount of rain and wind. The hurricane destroyed 3,000 homes in Cayey.

Impact of Henry Barracks Military Reservation
Henry Barracks Military Reservation was a lifeline for the residents of Cayey from 1901 to 1966, when it was declared excess land and passed to the General Services Administration for decommission. The property consisted of 439.92 acres. The property was divided into three prominent encampments: the Spanish Camp or Campamento Español (15 acres), Camp Henry or Henry Barracks, the Home of the third Battalion of the 65th Inf. Regiment that consisted of 372 acres, and 67 acres the Cayey Naval Radio Station (67 acres)). This reservation is situated in the east of the town of Cayey. The Spanish Reservation containing an area of approximately 15 acres, known as Hospital Hill was set apart by Executive Order of June 30, 1903, under an Act of Congress approved on July 7, 1902. The main army post was located in the northern part of the reservation, initially housing the Puerto Rico Volunteer Infantry Regiment.

The combined posts had approximately 1,200 men who used the resources provided by the town people. Families moved into Punta Brava and Vieques neighborhoods. A laundry, show shop, and other smaller stores were located right outside the gate. By 1906 about 350 civilians had jobs in the two posts (Camp Henry and The Cayey Navy Radio Station).

The U.S. Department of the Navy submitted a proposal to raise three 620 feet tall masts as part of a global radio communication linkage. In 1916 the Department of the Navy approved a budget of $40,000. At the time 300 men were hired to build the facility for a period of two-year, the project was completed in 1918

On September 11, 1928, a category five hurricane called San Felipe destroyed the temporary buildings at Henry Barracks, and the Navy Radio Station. A radio message was sent from the Cayey Navy Radio Station on September 18, 1928, to follow “All buildings Henry Barracks destroyed by hurricane September 13th”.
The Navy left Cayey and moved its station to Isla Grande and Stop 7  in Puerto de Tierra. All the land held by the Navy included Magazine Hill (known in the community as "El Polvorin"), which was taken over by the U. S. Army. The 65th Infantry Regiment remained in the north side of the post. The south side was converted into two 1,000 feet shooting ranges 
The decision was made to reconstruct all building for the regiment in the north side in concrete  One hundred and ninety buildings were completed, to include the north side of Henry Barracks. Over 600 men were hired for a period of three years to work in these projects. During this period three large barrack buildings were constructed. The two one company barracks each had its own mess hall and kitchen and was occupied by an infantry company each. The two companies barrack located in the center of the quad occupied the Battalion Headquarters Co. and the Machine Gun Co.

By 1953, the U.S. Department of the Army had reached the conclusion that Henry Barracks would be closed in the near future. A full complement of maintenance personnel composed of professional, technical, and daily laborers were maintained in the Reservation. The growth of three major housing developments is evidence of the economic impact of the Reservation (Reparto Montellano, El Polvorin, Urbanización Aponte)
While the all-Puerto Rican 65th Infantry regiment would never return to its home base, several other initiatives were undertaken, which had a direct impact on the economic development of the town and the region, one such initiatives was the commissioning of the Caribbean Signal Agency in 1959. Over the coming years several tenants occupied the lands comprised by the Henry Barracks Military Reservation, among them:
 In the company size building to the west of the quad, the National Guard had its Officer Training School in 1965 and 1966. It was later moved to Camp Santiago in Salinas. The golf course was used as a helicopter landing strip.
 YMCA Cuerpos de Paz, and VESPRA (1965–68) had an Administration Building, a swimming pool, a golf course and three houses, which housed the majors and their families.
 The Encampment for Citizenship held its 1966 six-week encampment in the two-company building in the middle of the quad. One hundred fifty-one young leaders from 56 countries from all over the world meet in Cayey to learn to develop self-government and to perform community development projects.
 The Foundation for Community Development moved to the housing is located in the southeastern part of the Post until 1972. Thousands of people received training in community development, and leadership during those years.

Geography
Cayey is located in a valley surrounded by the Sierra de Cayey, a branching mountain range of the Cordillera Central where the Carite Forest Reserve is located, and the main ranges of the Cordillera Central to the west. Because of its location, Cayey is known for its mountains, its cool weather and its misty mornings, especially in winter. During Spanish colonial rule, Spanish soldiers assigned to Puerto Rico were sent to Cayey. Its cool weather resembled the weather of Spain and soldiers could become acclimated to the tropical weather. In winter, it is not unusual for the temperature to drop into the 50s °F.

The Carite Forest Reserve
Rivers are: Río Grande de Loíza, Río Guavate, Río Jájome, Río de la Plata and Río Maton.

Climate
The average annual rainfall is 100 inches (2,540 mm) and maximum rainfall record in 24 hours is 20.87 inches (530 mm) of rain.

Flora and fauna

The golden coquí (Eleutherodactylus jasperi; Spanish: coquí dorado) is a rare and possibly extinct leptodactylid frog species endemic to Puerto Rico. Native to the municipality of Caye, golden coquís have only been found in areas of dense bromeliad growth in the Sierra de Cayey between 2,123 and 2,575 feet (647 and 785 meters) above sea level. They get their name from the song the male coquis sing at night. It sounds like "cokee, cokee" so that is why they are called coqui in Spanish. The golden coqui is the smallest of the coqui frogs in Puerto Rico. Mature adult coquis are only roughly the size of a dime. Male coquis are more bright yellow where females tend to be more light yellow and brown. The golden coqui is the only frog species in the New World known to give birth to live young. These frogs are known around the whole island and are considered a symbol of Puerto Rico.

Barrios

Like all municipalities of Puerto Rico, Cayey is subdivided into barrios.

Beatriz
Cayey barrio-pueblo
 Cedro
 Cercadillo
 Culebras Alto
 Culebras Bajo
 Farallón
 Guavate
 Jájome Alto
 Jájome Bajo
 Lapa
 Matón Abajo
 Matón Arriba
 Monte Llano
 Pasto Viejo
 Pedro Ávila
 Piedras
 Quebrada Arriba
 Rincón
 Sumido
 Toita
 Vegas

Sectors
Barrios (which are like minor civil divisions) and subbarrios, in turn, are further subdivided into smaller local populated place areas/units called sectores (sectors in English). The types of sectores may vary, from normally sector to urbanización to reparto to barriada to residencial, among others.

Special Communities

 (Special Communities of Puerto Rico) are marginalized communities whose citizens are experiencing a certain amount of social exclusion. A map shows these communities occur in nearly every municipality of the commonwealth. Of the 742 places that were on the list in 2014, the following barrios, communities, sectors, or neighborhoods were in Cayey: Parcelas Nuevas in Beatriz, Cantera, Sector Jalda Abajo, Cedro, El Coquí, Jájome Bajo, La Placita, Saint Thomas, San Cristóbal, and La Vega.

Buildings and structures

Telemundo WKAQ TV Tower

It was built in 1971 and it is the second tallest man-made structure of Puerto Rico.

Pedro Montañez Stadium
The Pedro Montañez Municipal Stadium in Cayey, proceeded by the first Pedro Montañez Municipal Stadium in Cayey, is the home of the Toritos de Cayey Double-A baseball team, and the Benigno Fernandez Garcia Jr. High School's field day competitions.

Cayey Pegasus Broadcasting WAPA-TV Tower
The Cayey Pegasus Broadcasting tower, at coordinates 18°6'33"N and 66°3'2"W is the third-tallest structure in Puerto Rico.

Economy
Cayey's economy was based on growing tobacco, sugarcane and general fruits. Its agricultural economy that evolved starting in the 1950s has diminished considerably. Most of its agricultural products are imported from other islands in the Caribbean or mainland United States.

During the first half of the 20th century, Cayey was basically an agricultural area of small farmers and local haciendas dedicated to the farming of crops for the local market. During the 1920s and 1930s farmers increasingly lost their land to absentee landowners, mostly American companies, that turned to the cultivation of sugarcane and, to a lesser extent, tobacco for export. In the 1950s and 1960s some manufacturing concerns established plants in Cayey taking advantage of tax incentives offered by Operation Bootstrap, Puerto Rico's industrialization program.

An industrial base, in 1947 Cayey saw the beginning of industrial entrepreneurship. There were three factories in town, the Caribe Flower Co. in the Palo Seco neighborhood, a Baseball Factory in the Toita neighborhood, and a Uniform Factory in the back of the High School. These factories employed mostly females. By 1950 the men that worked agriculture became excess population and began migrating to the United States or join the military. In 1950 with the approval of Fomento Industrial and Operation Bootstrap there was a boom of light factories in Cayey. The Gordonshire Knitting Mill in the Guayama road had twelve large buildings and ran two shifts with more than 1,000 employees, and the Consolidated Cigar Corporation across from the road from the Reparto Montellano neighborhood operated three shifts employing over 2,500 from Cayey and surrounding towns.

There is a Coca-Cola bottling location in Cayey.

Crime in Cayey
In August 2019, El Vocero newspaper reported there had been three mass shootings, that year, in Cayey.

Tourism
Cayey is a mountainous municipality with many places of interest.

Landmarks and places of interest
There are seven places in Cayey listed on the US National Register of Historic Places:

Church Nuestra Señora de la Asunción of Cayey
La Liendre Bridge
Arenas Bridge
Carretera Central
Río Matón Bridge
Carretera No. 4 (today PR-15) including the Principe Alfonso XII Bridge.
Other landmarks, landscapes and places of interest are:
La Robleda Protected Natural Area
Comsat Station
Ramón Frade Exhibit
Brisas De Cayey
Monumento a Los Tres Reyes Magos
Carite Forest
Lago Carite
Escuela de Bellas Artes
El Salón de La Fama del Deporte
El Faro del Saber
University of Puerto Rico at Cayey
Museo de Arte Pio López
Pedro Montañez Municipal Stadium
Teatro Municipal
Banda Municipal de Cayey
Tuna de Cayey
Casino Real

Culture

Festivals and events
Cayey celebrates its patron saint festival in August. The  is a religious and cultural celebration that generally features parades, games, artisans, amusement rides, regional food, and live entertainment.

Other festivals and events celebrated in Cayey include:
Regional Fair – April
Torito Olympics – April

Demographics

Government

All municipalities in Puerto Rico are administered by a mayor, elected every four years. The current mayor of Cayey is Rolando Ortíz, of the Popular Democratic Party (PPD). He was elected at the 1996 general elections and has remained in office through all intervening elections since.

The city belongs to the Puerto Rico Senatorial district VI, which is represented by two Senators. In 2012, Miguel Pereira Castillo and Angel M. Rodríguez were elected as District Senators.

Symbols
The  has an official flag and coat of arms.

Flag
The flag derives its design and colors from the coat of arms, which is in the center of the flag encircled by a solid black ring. The centered coat of arms and has four triangles pointing to it, two white and two red.

Coat of arms
The coat of arms has a three tip mountain, a red bull, and a waving blue stripe representing the abundant water in the zone and also in reverence to the primitive matron of the town of Cayey. The shield is topped with the silver lamb symbol of San Juan of Puerto Rico, and a red book.

Transportation

Cayey has direct access to Puerto Rico Highway 52 and its downtown/business area is served by Puerto Rico Highway 14, which grants access to Aibonito to the west and is the main route to the University of Puerto Rico in town, and by Puerto Rico Highway 15 which grants access to south Cayey and Guayama. Puerto Rico Highway 1 Bypass runs through the town's business area. Due to its proximity to Caguas and easy access via PR-52, Cayey has seen significant growth in the last years.

There are 82 bridges in Cayey many of which travel over Rio de la Plata.

Education

The following schools are in Cayey:

 Benigno Carrion grades: K – 5
 Benigno Fernandez Garcia grades: 6 – 8
 Benjamin Harrison High School grades: 9 – 12
 Centro Adiest. Vocacional Gabriel Bibiloni
 Dr. Ramon Emeterio Betances grades: 6 – 8
 Emerita Leon Elemental grades: PK – 6
 Especializada de Bellas Artes grades: 7 – 12
 Miguel Melendez Muñoz grades: 9 – 12
 Salvador Brau Elemental grades: K – 5
 Su Certenejas II grades: K – 8
 Su Eugenio Maria de Hostos grades: K – 8
 Su Gerardo Selles Sola grades: K – 8
 Virginia Vazquez Mendoza grades: K – 5

Higher education
 University of Puerto Rico at Cayey
 University of Turabo at Cayey
 Instituto de Banca y Comercio (satellite campus at Cayey)
 Liberty Technical College

Health care
Hospital Menonita de Cayey
Hospital Municipal de Cayey

Notable natives and residents
 Alexis y Fido
 Ricardo Aponte, Brigadier General
 Raymond Arrieta, comedian
 Hiram Burgos, pro baseball player, retired pitcher Milwaukee Brewers
 Christian Colón, pro baseball player, the hit that won the 2015 World Series
 Ramón Frade, visual artist/painter
 Luis Guzmán, actor
 Jorge López, birthplace of star Baltimore Orioles pitcher
 Alberto Mercado, boxer, resides in Cayey
 Pedro Montañez, professional boxer
 Joseph O. Prewitt Díaz, psychologist, Recipient of the APA International Humanitarian Award 2008
 Amazing Red, pro wrestler
 Zuleyka Rivera, Miss Puerto Rico Universe 2006, Miss Universe 2006
 Marcelino Sánchez, actor
 Wisin & Yandel, reggaeton group
 José Ortiz Puerto Rican Basketball Legend, Former NBA Player
 Lionel Fernández Méndez, Attorney at Law, Juris Doctor Georgetown University, Washington DC, Member Delegate of Cayey and the District of Guayama to the Puerto Rico Constitutional Assembly, Politician and Senator of Cayey and the District of Guayama, UPR ( University of Puerto Rico) Cayey founding member-claiming as Senator for education the land that was the Henry Barracks Army Camp of Cayey. Son of Lcdo. Benigno Fernández García.

Sister cities
Middletown, Connecticut
Melilli, Sicily, Italy

Gallery

See also
National Register of Historic Places listings in Cayey, Puerto Rico

History of Puerto Rico
List of Puerto Ricans

References

Further reading

External links 

University of Puerto Rico, (UPR) Cayey 
Cayey, Puerto Rico, a musical slideshow (YouTube) 
Guavate Cayey, PR Guide to open market 

 
Municipalities of Puerto Rico
San Juan–Caguas–Guaynabo metropolitan area
Populated places established in 1773
1773 establishments in North America
1770s establishments in Puerto Rico
1773 establishments in the Spanish Empire